Oxyna tarbagatajensis is a species of fruit fly in the family Tephritidae.

Distribution
Kazakhstan.

References

Tephritinae
Insects described in 1990
Diptera of Asia